John Rugee (January 3, 1827 – March 7, 1894) was a member of the Wisconsin State Assembly.

Biography
Rugee was born John Christopher Rugee on January 3, 1827 in Lübeck. He married Malvina C. Palmer. They had four children. Rugee died of cancer on March 7, 1894, in Redlands, California. He is buried at Forest Home Cemetery in Milwaukee, Wisconsin.

Career
Rugee was a member of the Assembly in 1861. He was also a Presidential Elector for the 1884 United States Presidential Election. In his professional life, he designed a number of churches, grain elevators, and bridges.

Some of Rugee's buildings include:
 Jasper Humphrey house, 634 S Third Street, Milwaukee, 1868.

References

People from Lübeck
German emigrants to the United States
1827 births
1894 deaths
Deaths from cancer
19th-century American politicians
Republican Party members of the Wisconsin State Assembly